Lyle Howry (born June 19, 1958, in Los Angeles) is an American film producer. He is known for his MMA film, Street (2015), You Can’t Have It, Warriors of Virtue and Delta Force One: The Lost Patrol.

Early life and Career 

In 1985, he co-executive produced 5 episodes of CBS's The Dukes of Hazzard. In 1997, he was executive producer on "Reggie's Prayer". He also co-executive produced A Dog of Flanders (1999 film).

In 1999, he launched his film production company, Skinfly Entertainment.

In 2015, Skinfly Entertainment released MMA movie film, Street.

In 2017, Howry's film production company released the thriller You Can't Have It, starring Armand Assante.

Selected filmography

References

External links

1958 births
Living people
Film producers from California
People from Los Angeles